GT Legends is a sports car racing simulator for the PC developed by SimBin Studios (later Sector3 Studios) and published by 10tacle Publishing. It is based on the 2005 FIA Historic Racing Championships
for GTC and TC cars of the 1960s and 1970s. This is a modern-day championship for historic cars, and so the circuit designs in GT Legends are those of the modern era, contrasting with games such as Grand Prix Legends which are actually set in historic times.

GT Legends has the same graphics engine as rFactor (developed by Image Space Incorporated), a similar physics engine but different multiplayer code.

Reception 

GT Legends received "generally favorable" reviews, according to review aggregator Metacritic.

Eurogamer praised the game's graphics, setting, handling, car selection, options, and difficulty. GameSpot praised the car models, physics modeling, sophisticated audio, options, and vintage cars, while criticizing some technical issues, lack of rain races, the requirement of high-end computing power, progression, and reduced damage.

References

External links
 Official website
 Gamespot GTL Review

2005 video games
Racing simulators
Racing video games
SimBin Studios games
Video games developed in Sweden
Video games scored by Stephen Baysted
Video games set in Belgium
Video games set in France
Video games set in Germany
Video games set in Italy
Video games set in Sweden
Video games set in the United Kingdom
Windows games
Windows-only games
Multiplayer and single-player video games
10tacle Studios games